Băcia is a commune in Hunedoara County, Transylvania, Romania. It is composed of four villages: Băcia, Petreni (Petrény), Tâmpa (Tompa) and Totia (Nagytóti).

Natives
 Petru Groza

References

Communes in Hunedoara County
Localities in Transylvania